The 2007 dance-pop song "Do It" performed by Canadian singer-songwriter Nelly Furtado features elements plagiarized from "Acidjazzed Evening", a chiptune-style track composed by the Finnish demoscene artist Janne Suni. Timbaland, "Do Its producer, admitted to sampling Suni's work, but did not believe his usage constituted "stealing", calling the allegations "ridiculous". Although users had noted the similarities between the two tracks on Finnish demoscene forums in July 2006, the Timbaland plagiarism controversy attracted mainstream attention in January 2007, when Internet users posted videos to YouTube alleging Timbaland had plagiarized Suni's work. Soon afterwards, the controversy attracted the attention of the Finnish news portal eDome, and the MTV and Rolling Stone websites, who all published articles detailing the events of the controversy. 
"Do It" was released as the fifth North American single from Loose on July 24, 2007.

Background
The original track, titled "Acidjazzed Evening", is a chiptune-style, 4-channel Amiga module composed by Finnish demoscener Janne Suni (a.k.a. Tempest). The song won first place in the Oldskool Music competition at Assembly 2000, a demoparty held in Helsinki, Finland, in 2000. According to Scene.org, the song was uploaded to their servers the same year, long before the release of the song by Furtado. The song was later remixed (with Suni's permission) by Norwegian Glenn Rune Gallefoss (a.k.a. GRG) for the Commodore 64 in SID format—this is the version that was later used for "Do It". It was first published in a disk magazine in Australia in August 2002 and was added to the High Voltage SID Collection on December 21, 2002.

A video that claims to show proof of the plagiarism was posted to YouTube on January 12, 2007. Another video was posted to YouTube on January 14, 2007, claiming Timbaland also stole the tune a year earlier for the ringtone Block Party, one of several that were sold in the United States in 2005.

Authors' comments

Janne Suni
Janne Suni posted the following comment regarding the copyright status of "Acidjazzed Evening" on January 15, 2007:

On February 16, 2007, he added the following note:

On September 9, 2007, his webpage was updated with the following information:

Glenn Gallefoss
The C64 news portal C64.sk published the following comment from Glenn R. Gallefoss on January 15, 2007:

On February 3, Gallefoss published the following comment on his personal web page:

Universal / Nelly Furtado
Hannu Sormunen, a Finnish representative of Universal, which represents Nelly Furtado in Finland, commented the controversy as follows in the January 15, 2007, issue of Iltalehti:

The first legal action against Universal Finland was officially filed with Helsinki District Court in mid-August 2007, on behalf of Glenn R. Gallefoss.

Timbaland
On February 2, 2007, Timbaland responded to the plagiarism accusations in an interview on the radio show Elliot in the Morning. In this interview, Timbaland admitted to what he called "sampling", but he also claimed that sampling is "not stealing", because "everybody samples from everybody every day". Timbaland also said that the sample is "from a video game" and mentioned the Commodore 64. He also said that he has no time for research and that it is sometimes impossible to "know what's public domain and what's not". Timbaland also called the issue "ridiculous" but mentioned that he is "in legal discussions" and therefore was not able to say much about it. He also called Janne Suni an "idiot" and a "freakin' jerk" on the show.

On February 9, 2007, Timbaland commented on the issue in an MTV interview:

Third-party analysis
A device in Timbaland's studio, as seen in video clips from the MTV show Timbaland's Diary, has been identified as an Elektron SidStation. This device is a MIDI-controlled synthesizer based on the SID chip of the Commodore 64, and it is capable of playing back .sid files the way they would have sounded on the original hardware. It has been speculated that Timbaland downloaded Gallefoss' version of the song from the High Voltage SID Collection and used the SidStation for running it to the studio system.

Chris Abbott, maintainer of the website C64Audio.com, posted an in-depth analysis on the topic and summarizes it in his online article. Abbott has commercially released Commodore 64 music, most notably the Back in Time CD series. Abbott writes:

Abbott also notes that although the evidence seems to be conclusive, the eventual outcome is not.

Court proceedings
In August 2007, an action for infringement was filed in the District Court of Helsinki against Universal Music, Ltd, alleging Nelly Furtado's song "Do It" infringed "Acidjazzed Evening". In January 2009, after a trial that included multiple expert and technical witnesses, a three-judge panel unanimously dismissed the plaintiff's case.

On December 17, 2008, Abbott also testified as a witness of prosecution in the Helsinki court in Gallefoss's case against Universal Music Finland. The Finnish court reportedly threw out the case after ruling in only one aspects of the three claims (sampling, performance rights, producer rights), and the case remained in appellate court as of January 2010.

On June 12, 2009, Mikko Välimäki, who is one of the legal counsels of Kernel Records, the owner of the sound recording rights, reported that the case had been filed in Florida. On June 7, 2011, the case of Kernel Records Oy v. Mosley ended with the court deciding that the tune was a US work as it had been first published on the Internet and that Kernel Records had failed to register for copyright in the United States. This reversed the decision of Moberg v. 33T LLC, which decided that a photograph published online in Germany was not a US work.

The copyright dispute was eventually settled out of court for an undisclosed sum.

Similar cases
Earlier examples of unauthorized commercial use of SID music have been brought up by sources covering the Timbaland plagiarism controversy.

An often-mentioned example is Zombie Nation's 1999 hit Kernkraft 400, which was a remake of David Whittaker's song for the 1984 Commodore 64 game Lazy Jones. As of 2023, legal action is pending, highlighting just how long copyright cases can be delayed or drawn out. Another example is the Dutch hit "You've Got My Love", for which the artist Bas "Bastian" Bron sampled the drums from Jeroen Tel's and Reyn Ouwehand's song made for the game Rubicon. Both of the cases were won by the original authors in court.

The Fitts for Fight case also involved copied chipmusic.

In April 2008, a similar case was revealed about self-proclaimed "chiptune maestro" Laromlab, who released his self-titled album on Mushpot Records; shortly after, it was discovered that the entire album is in fact the work of a chiptune collective called the YM Rockerz. Mushpot responded by dropping Laromlab immediately from the label, and Laromlab himself has issued an apology, stating the "project was a hoax, a complete fallacy".

Media coverage

The beginnings of the controversy
The earliest Internet forum posts suggesting that "Do It" was based on "Acidjazzed Evening" date back to July 2006, and according to the Finnish news portal eDome, "Suni and other demoscene hobbyists" already knew about it at this time.

Mainstream coverage
One of the first large media to react to the on-line controversy was the Finnish Broadcasting Company, which published a news item on the topic on January 14, 2007.

The electronic music magazine Side-Line put a complete news round-up up on its website. Finnish tabloids Ilta-Sanomat, Iltalehti, and newspapers ITviikko, and DigiToday also published articles about the suspected plagiarism on January 15, 2007.

On January 16, Finnish news portal eDome published an article about the case saying in the English summary that:

The article also covered similar cases from the past and notified that both the competition and the prize ceremony "were witnessed by the 4000-5000 people at the event. The competition and the ceremony were also shown in Helsinki area cable TV". The same day, the news reached Norwegian media, including Norwegian Broadcasting Corporation and Dagbladet, both of which interviewed Gallefoss.

On January 17, the case was reported on briefly by the Rolling Stone website, XXL Magazine,
and the popular German IT news portal Heise online. Heise's story suggests that Timbaland downloaded Gallefoss's SID arrangement from the High Voltage SID Collection.

On January 18, Rolling Stone put the controversy as top news of the day with a more detailed article. Later that day the San Jose Mercury News covered the story on their blog.

On January 22, MTV took notice of the issue with a longer article and video news. It is not clear if this video news was actually broadcast or merely posted online. MTV-owned sister station VH-1 also published the MTV news story. MTV had attempted to reach Timbaland's representatives via phone and e-mail, but they "had not responded at press time".

See also
MOS Technology SID
 Fitts for Fight
 Dow Jones & Co Inc v Gutnick
 Moberg v. 33T LLC

References

External links
 Acidjazzed Evening (MOD format, ZIP-compressed)
 "Do It" music video on YouTube
 Acid Jazz (C64 remix) (SID format)
Collection of different sources about the issue

2007 in music
2007 controversies
Plagiarism
2007 scandals
Plagiarism controversies
Demoscene
Sampling controversies
Entertainment scandals
Copyright infringement